Gabriela Anahí Suárez (born 2 February 2001) is a sprinter from Ecuador.

In 2018, she won double gold in the 100 metres and 200 metres at the South American U18 Championships in Athletics. She won bronze in the 100 metres at the 2018 Summer Youth Olympics.

On 12 December 2020 in Quito she ran 100 metres in 11.16 seconds which placed her 12th on the year list worldwide for 2020.

In July 2021, Suarez was named to the Ecuador Olympic squad for the 4x100 relay.

References

External links
 

2001 births
Living people
Ecuadorian female sprinters
Athletes (track and field) at the 2018 Summer Youth Olympics
Athletes (track and field) at the 2020 Summer Olympics
People from Ibarra, Ecuador
Olympic athletes of Ecuador
21st-century Ecuadorian women